Eamonn O'Brien is a British Labour politician and leader of Bury Metropolitan Borough Council in Greater Manchester. As leader he is also a member of the Greater Manchester Combined Authority and is the combined authority's portfolio lead for Education, Skills, Work, Apprenticeships and Digital.

First elected to the council in 2014, he is the councillor for the St Mary's ward in Prestwich and, prior to his election as leader, served on the council's executive with responsibility for finance and housing from 2017.

In addition to  his duties as a councillor, council leader, and member of the GMCA, he is also an office administrator for a national charity.

References 

Living people
Labour Party (UK) councillors
Leaders of local authorities of England
Year of birth missing (living people)
Members of the Greater Manchester Combined Authority